God Is Dead is a comic book series created by Jonathan Hickman and Mike Costa, published by American company Avatar Press.  It deals with ancient gods and goddesses from mythologies around the world coming to Earth to lay claim to the world of man.  The subplot deals with a group of people named the Collective, who resist the ancient gods.

Publication history 

God is Dead began as a six-issue limited series in September 2013, with Hickman and Costa as co-writers.  Once the initial six-issue story arc concluded, the comic became an ongoing series with Costa as the only writer.
In August 2014, Alan Moore and Simon Spurrier contributed to the first issue of a new story arc entitled God Is Dead: The Book of Acts.  The series concluded in 2016 with its 48th issue.

Cover art 

The cover art of the comics typically featured five different covers.  The initial one would be a solid color with a religious symbol.  The other styles of covers were "Enchanted", "Iconic", "Carnage", and "End of Days".

Plot 

In 2015, a man claiming to be Zeus, the ancient Greek god of thunder, arrives in Vatican City and claims the Earth as his domain.   This event becomes known as the Second Coming.  In subsequent months, several other figures claiming to be gods and goddesses emerge as if from nowhere, and begin to divide the Earth into different territories.  Fighting between the various gods breaks out, and drags the Earth into war.

Unknown to the gods, an underground society known as the Collective suspects that the gods are not who they appear to be, and seek to create their own new gods to rival those of the ancient pantheons.  The Collective is eventually destroyed by the gods, but one member, Gaby, survives, and a generation later has risen to take the identity of the Earth Mother, Gaia.

As Gaia, Gaby rules over the world virtually unchallenged by the gods that still remain.  One of her followers, Tansy, travels to Australia, which has been abandoned since the events of the Second Coming.  Once there, she meets a man named Albert Spencer, who survived the Second Coming and has been residing in the Dreamtime with a ragtag group of humans.  Together, they use a device to go to Heaven and find the Judeo-Christian God with his head blown off.  Albert then decides to unite the remnants of Earth's pantheons to lead an assault on Gaia.

As Albert attempts to form alliances, at Gaia's palace, her servants begin to question her motives and her divinity after she kills multiple members of the community that worship her.  Hephaestus forms his own alliance among Gaia and Baldr, and organizes a counterattack against the lesser gods, which is successful, until the lesser gods attack. Hephaestus then descends into the bowels of a nearby mountain, and releases the Titans to do battle. Meanwhile, Lily, Gaia's high priestess who discovers the Collective's hideout, flies with a massive dragon, carrying a nuclear weapon.  A final battle is waged between the Titans and the remnants of the gods, ending with Lily dropping a nuclear weapon and killing Gaia.  In doing so, the Earth begins to dry and shrivel, until Jesus, dressed as a normal human man, emerges in a flash of light.

Soon after, Albert shoots Jesus in the head, saying he has had enough of Saviors and gods. However, he soon discovers the world dissolving, including the Dreamtime.  Jesus shows up in Australia and resurrects not only the Earth, but the population as well.  Albert rushes home and finds his family alive and well.  As they explore the city, they are attacked by a group of thugs, and his family is attacked and seemingly killed.  But he discovers they are alive, although maimed.  He goes and confronts Jesus, Dionysus, and Tansy as they celebrate.  Jesus and Tansy escape, but Dionysus is torn apart.  Across the world in Greece, Hephaestus, who has escaped from the Underworld with Apollo, arrives in Olympus, and to his shock finds Zeus alive and well, having been resurrected by Jesus's powers.

Accused of treachery by the other Olympian gods, Hephaestus is imprisoned, and soon after it is revealed that Jesus's resurrection magic worked not only on the Olympian pantheon, but all the other Pantheons as well as the Norse Gods arrive led by Odin to lead an assault on Olympus.  The attack results in every Olympian being massacred, with Zeus being sent to the Underworld underneath his brother Hades.  In the Underworld, it is revealed that there is a tentative alliance between Hades and Satan, who is having relations with Hades' wife, Persephone.  A city is founded called Apollonia, named after the sun god Apollo, which only allows the most perfect physical specimens of mankind into its walls.  In Australia, in order to stop the suffering of all the people in the world who cannot die from their horrific wounds, Tansy releases the dragon Baphomet who bites Jesus in half and kills him, enabling people on Earth to die again.

As people now find that they are able to die again, an assault is led on the Titans to stop them from destroying the Earth.  In a final desperate attempt, Atlas calls upon Gaia, Mother Earth, herself to avenge him and his brethren.  She resurrects and begins to destroy the Earth and the heavens, even going so far as to devour the moon.  The only who can stop her is Gaby, who is still human in this resurrected timeline.  In order to stop Gaia, she chooses to take the concoction that made her Gaia, and emerges as a stone encrusted female figure.  She attacks Gaia, but the resulting attack succeeds in destroying the Earth and opening a black hole.  Satan reveals this was the plan all along, even though it will result in his destruction.  He is consumed by Baphomet and the Earth vanishes, along with the deities, into a black hole.

In a limbo, all the deities have been resurrected and are constantly fighting under the eyes of the death deities of various Pantheons.  The Hindu Pantheon receive a visitor in the form of a nude woman who calls herself Siddharta and the Buddha, and that she is here to spread learning and knowledge to the Pantheons.  It is revealed that she has actually come from another universe where there is no belief in gods, where she sought enlightenment and ended up travelling between dimensions to the limbo where the deities are.  As she travels to visit the various gods to collect artifacts, the death gods become curious as to where the portal she came through leads.  One of them, the African deity Ogbunabali, decides to investigate and falls into a void to land in Siddharta's mortal body on the other side.  Crazed with the ability to feel life, he goes on a murderous rampage.

Elsewhere, the mention in the world of the name Zeus summons the Greek deity from limbo to this world.  Once there, he goes about establishing himself by bringing Hermes with him and having sex with multiple women to bring his bastards into the world.  Sensing new territory, the Egyptian pantheon follows suit, and soon are engaged into another battle with the Greek deities.  The Aztecs are soon called upon to fight for this world, but all the Pantheons are shocked when God is resurrected.

Flashing forward, churches are being constructed.  Siddharta seeks asylum in the realm of the Japanese Kami, as the other Pantheons are attacked by the angels of God.  She makes an alliance with the Kami and travels to the trickster Gods, asking them for help in retrieving her body. With the help of them and the Kami, she is able to take control of her body and banish Ogbunabali from it.  As Siddharta recovers, Satan leads the remainder of the Norse gods to Heaven and begins an assault on it, while Loki on a mission to start Ragnarok obtains two god killers, who are able to end the lives of gods permanently. He is betrayed by Ogbunabali, who kills Loki and takes control of the god killers.  Satan kills God and takes control of heaven as Siddharta takes control of the global news network.

In the final conflict, Ogbunabali is killed by Amaterasu, and this leads the two god killers to go on a rampage, killing all the members of every Pantheon on Earth.  With all the deities destroyed, Siddharta kills herself, appearing in spirit form before the god killing brothers, and summons them to an eternal paradise as the world has no more need of deities.  Years later, society has rebuilt, but in a final shot, the skull Siddharta drew can be seen on a wall in an alleyway.

Pantheons 

The comic features the members of many of the Pantheons of the Ancient world.  The following have made appearances in the series:

The Aboriginal Pantheon
Altjira
Green Ants

The Ashanti Pantheon 
Anansi

 The Aztec Pantheon
Huitzilopochtli
Mictlantecuhtli
Mictecacihuatl
Quetzalcoatl
Tezcatlipoca

The Babylonian Pantheon
Dagon

Brazilian Folklore
Saci

Buddhism
Chakrasamavara

The Canaanite Pantheon
Astoreth
Moloch

The Celtic Pantheon
Arianrhod
Artio (issue #8 cover only)
Branwen
Rhiannon
The Cù-sìth
The Nuckelavee

The Egyptian Pantheon
Anubis
Bastet
Horus
Isis
Ra
 The Ogdoad

The Greek Pantheon
Aphrodite
Apollo
Ares
Artemis
Athena
Cerberus
Chimera
Clio
Demeter
Dionysus
Enyalius
Euterpe
Eris
Eros
Hades
Hecate
Helios
Hephaestus
Hermes
Janus
Moros
Nike
Oizys
Pan
Persephone
Phantasos
Phobetor
Poseidon
Thanatos
Zeus

The Hindu Pantheon
Brahma
Ganesha
Kartikeya
Mara
Parvati
Sheshanaga
Shiva
Trimurti – While not an actual deity, Vishnu, Brahma, and Shiva could merge to form a giant being referred to as the Trimurti.
Vishnu

The Igbo Pantheon
Ogbunabali

The Japanese Pantheon
Amaterasu
Izanagi
Izanami
Kagutsuchi 
Susanoo

The Judeo-Christian Pantheon
Adam
Azazel
Baphomet
Beelzebub
Eve
God
Jesus
Jibreel
Mammon
Michael
Satan
Serpent
Uriel
The Seraphim

The Norse Pantheon
Baldr
Bergelmir
Fenrir
Heiðr
Heimdallr
Hel
Jormungandr
Loki
Móðguðr
Odin
Ratatoskr
Surtr
Thor
Váli

The Polynesian Pantheon
Māui
The Adaro
The Moai

The Slavic Pantheon
Baba Yaga

The Sumerian Pantheon
Thammuz

The Titans
Arke
Atlas
Cronus
Gaia
Iapetus
Perses
Phoebe
Oceanus
Rhea

The Arabic Pantheon
 Iblis
 Ifrit

Native American Pantheon
Bakbakwalanooksiwae – A cannibalistic deity from the far North of America.
Coyote
Deer Women
Nayenezgani and Tobadzistsini – Two brothers who have the ability to kill gods.
Wendigo

Reception 

The series has received mostly negative reviews. Hugh Armitage of Digital Spy said that the series is an old concept, and that the characters are too one-dimensional. Armitage went on to say that the portrayal of the Hindu gods would be offensive to modern Hindus. 
Cheryl CS of The Pulp praised the art and fight scenes, but called the main story "cheesy" and "confusing."

References 

2013 comics debuts
Avatar Press titles
American comics titles
Comics by Jonathan Hickman
Limbo
Fiction about deities